John Brennan is a former Gaelic footballer who played with Castleisland Desmonds and Kerry. He won an All Ireland Under 21 title in 1996. He played one championship game in the first round of the 1997 championship.

References

 http://www.terracetalk.com/kerry-football/player/145/John-Brennan/League
 https://web.archive.org/web/20190328115822/http://munster.gaa.ie/history/u21f_teams/

Castleisland Gaelic footballers
Gaelic football goalkeepers
Kerry inter-county Gaelic footballers
Living people
Year of birth missing (living people)